Meera Deosthale (born 16 November 1995) is an Indian actress who primarily  works in Hindi television. She is best known for playing Chakor Suraj Rajvanshi in the television series Udaan.

Early life 
Deosthale was born on 16 November 1995 in Vadodara, Gujarat. While in school, Deosthale was a state-level basketball player and focused on sports, later moving to Mumbai with her mother when she developed an interest in being an actress and finished school.

Career 
Deosthale made her television debut with Colors TV's Sasural Simar Ka as Priya and then appeared in Zindagi Wins. In 2015, she played Eshwari Thakur in Dilli Wali Thakur Gurls. 

From February 2016, Deosthale starred as Chakor Rajvanshi in Colors TV's Udaan which gave her household popularity. She quit the show in March 2019, after doing it for three years, and was replaced by Toral Rasputra.

In September 2019, she was cast in the titular role in Colors TV's Vidya until it went off air abruptly in March 2020 due to COVID-19 pandemic. In 2022, she played Paridhi Khurana in Gud Se Meetha Ishq on Star Bharat.

Filmography

Television

Guest appearances

Web series

Music videos

Awards and nominations

References

External links

 
 Meera Deosthale on Instagram

Living people
Indian television actresses
Indian soap opera actresses
People from Vadodara
1995 births
21st-century Indian actresses
Actresses in Hindi television